Leslie Adrienne Miller (born 1956) is the author of five collections of poems.

Professor of English at the University of St. Thomas in St. Paul, Minnesota, Miller holds a B.A. from Stephens College, an M.A. from the University of Missouri, and an M.F.A. from the Iowa Writers' Workshop and a Ph.D. from the University of Houston.

Her poems have appeared in The Kenyon Review, North American Review, Antioch Review, Georgia Review, The American Poetry Review, Prairie Schooner and New England Review.

Works
 Y: Poems (Graywolf Press, 2012)
 The Resurrection Trade (Graywolf Press, 2007)
 Eat Quite Everything You See (Graywolf Press, 2002)
 Yesterday Had a Man in it (Carnegie Mellon University Press, 1998)
 Ungodliness (Carnegie Mellon University Press, 1994)
 Staying Up For Love (Carnegie Mellon University Press, 1990)

External links 
www.lesliemillerpoet.com
Minnesota Public Radio Feature
Poetry Daily, Two Poems
Poem, Academy of American Poets
Ploughshares Magazine, Bio
Water Stone Review, Poem
Graywolf Press
City Pages Article

Living people
1956 births
University of Houston alumni
University of Missouri alumni
Stephens College alumni
Iowa Writers' Workshop alumni
Place of birth missing (living people)
American women poets
20th-century American poets
20th-century American women writers
21st-century American women